Jackson Gill (born 20 December 1994) is a New Zealand track and field athlete who competes in the shot put. Gill throws with his right hand, using the spin technique. In 2012, he defended his title at the 2012 World Junior Championships.

Career 

Gill first came to prominence in late 2009 when he set world age-14 bests with the 5 kg Shot (20.42m) and 6 kg Shot (17.41m).
At the 2010 World Junior Championships in Athletics, as a 15-year-old, Gill won the gold in the shot put (6 kg) with a distance of 20.76m, beating 18- and 19-year-olds and becoming the youngest-ever male junior champion.

In 2010, prior to the World Junior Championships, Gill threw the 5 kg shot 22.53m at an event in Stockholm, Sweden, exceeding the best-known performances with that weight for 15- and 16-year-olds. He improved to 22.60m in finishing second at the inaugural Youth Olympic Games despite being unwell. On 11 December 2010, at the New Zealand National Secondary Schools Championships, Gill set a youth (under-18) world-best performance of 23.86m (5 kg).

On 26 March 2011, at the New Zealand National Championships, Gill achieved 21.34m with the 6 kg shot, at the time ranking him 4th on the all-time IAAF junior list for shot put.

On 23 April 2011, at 16 years of age, Gill threw 20.01m with the senior shot (7.26 kg). Gill's throw broke the 44-year-old New Zealand national record set by Les Mills in 1967.
This performance surpassed the standard for the 2011 Athletics World Championships, however the rules for that competition exclude anyone of Jacko's age competing in any throwing events. An appeal to the IAAF for an exception to be made to this regulation to allow Gill to compete was rejected. The performance also surpassed the B standard for the 2012 Olympics however not only was it outside the qualifying period (which started on 1 May) it was also less than the qualification standard (20.30m) subsequently set by Athletics New Zealand. However, he did go on to qualify for the 2012 Olympics on 5 December 2011 by throwing 20.38m. On the same occasion he threw 22.31 with the 6 kg shot to become the second furthest junior (under-20) thrower ever with that weight. Gill has been reported as the youngest and one of the lightest athletes to throw over 20m.

On 7 July 2011 at the 2011 World Youth Championships in Athletics in Lille Métropole, France, Gill won the gold medal by 4m with a  World Youth Best Performance of 24.35m, which he subsequently improved later that year with a throw of 24.45m in Auckland on 12 December.

In 2013 Gill broke the Oceania Junior Record with 22.32m at Brisbane, Australia on 20 July and then with 22.54m at the North Shore, Auckland on 4 August. On 18 August, also at the North Shore in Auckland, he threw 23.00 to break the World Junior Record.

On 25 June 2014 in Rarotonga, Gill improved his personal best to 20.70m in winning the shot put title at the 2014 Oceania Area Championships in Athletics.

Personal life

Gill's father, Walter, is a former discus thrower and national shot-put champion, and his mother, Nerida, is a former discus thrower. He attended Takapuna Grammar School until 2010. Jacko was the subject of a "feature" interview for the IAAF's March 2013 monthly on-line newsletter, in which he said he had a keen interest in the shot from an early age: “Since about 10 years old I've decided to write all of my lifting programs and schedules for my training. I didn't really fit in well at gyms, so I decided to do all weights in our garage at home. I enjoy weight-lifting, power-lifting mainly, so will lift for around four hours a day, and throw only a couple of times per week. " He also said that his athletic "hero" is Ricky Bruch, a former Discus World record-holder from Sweden.

Coaching 

Gill was coached by Didier Poppé during the years of his World Youth and World Junior Championships campaigns. In late 2012 he changed coaches and trained under the direction of former New Zealand shot champion Courtney Ireland. He is now coached principally by Kirsten Hellier.

Achievements

References

External links 
 
 
 
 
 

1994 births
Living people
New Zealand male shot putters
Olympic athletes of New Zealand
Athletes (track and field) at the 2010 Summer Youth Olympics
Athletes (track and field) at the 2016 Summer Olympics
Athletes (track and field) at the 2020 Summer Olympics
Commonwealth Games competitors for New Zealand
Athletes (track and field) at the 2014 Commonwealth Games
Athletes (track and field) at the 2022 Commonwealth Games
World Athletics Championships athletes for New Zealand
20th-century New Zealand people
21st-century New Zealand people
Commonwealth Games silver medallists for New Zealand
Commonwealth Games medallists in athletics
Medallists at the 2022 Commonwealth Games